The 2009 South Florida Bulls football team represented the University of South Florida (USF) in the 2009 NCAA Division I FBS football season. Their head coach was Jim Leavitt, and they played their home games at Raymond James Stadium in Tampa, Florida. The 2009 season was the 13th season overall for the Bulls, and their fifth season in the Big East Conference. The Bulls finished the season 8–5 (3–4 Big East) and won the International Bowl, 27–3, against Northern Illinois. The roster had 11 eventual NFL draft picks and a total of 14 players would go on to play in the NFL.

Schedule

Rankings

Roster

References

South Florida
South Florida Bulls football seasons
International Bowl champion seasons
South Florida Bulls football